KS Unia Janikowo is a Polish football club based in Janikowo, Poland. Founded in 1958.

External links 

 
Unia Janikowo at the 90minut.pl website (Polish)

 
Association football clubs established in 1958
1958 establishments in Poland